The Split CD (also known as Split 10" on vinyl) is a 1998 split EP featuring tracks from Queens of the Stone Age and Beaver. It is currently out of print and rare.

The songs "The Bronze" and "These Aren't the Droids You're Looking For" were later included in the 2011 reissue of Queens of the Stone Age's self-titled debut album, originally released in 1998.

The songs "Morocco" and "Absence Without Leave" are misprinted, and are labeled for the opposite songs.

Track listing

Personnel
Queens of the Stone Age
Josh Homme - vocals, guitar, bass (credited as "Carlo Von Sexron")
Alfredo Hernandez - drums

Beaver
Roel Schoenmakers - guitar, vocals
Jozsja de Weerdt - guitar
Milo Beenhakker - bass
Eva Nahon - drums

Additional musicians
Olaf Smit - additional guitar (4)

Production personnel
Joe Barresi - engineering, production (1, 2)
Steve Feldman - assistant engineering(1, 2)
Jacques de Haard - production, mastering (3, 4)
Beaver - production (3, 4)

Notes

References

External links
Official Beaver lyrics

Beaver (band) albums
1998 EPs
Albums produced by Joe Barresi
Queens of the Stone Age albums
Split EPs
Man's Ruin Records EPs